Nastola is a former municipality of Finland. It was merged with the city of Lahti on 1 January 2016.

In the province of Southern Finland, Nastola is part of the Päijät-Häme region. Nastola is located between two major cities: Lahti and Kouvola.

The municipality was unilingually Finnish.

History 
Ornamental items, presumed to date back to the 1200s, have been found in the village of Ruuhijärvi. Although the items are of Karelian design, scholars agree that they are not necessarily indicative of Karelian settlement in Nastola. Additionally, English, German and Scandinavian coins have been found in Immilä. Etymologic research indicates that the earliest settlers in Nastola originated from contemporary Asikkala and Hollola, in addition to the surroundings of lake Vanajavesi; indeed, Ruuhijärvi, then covering most of what is now known as Nastola, became one of the quarters of the administrative parish of Asikkala in the 1500s.

The name of Nastola may be of Karelian origin, referring to a Karelian male name Nasto (folk form of Anastasios). The first administrative center over the area was Uusikylä, which was also the name of an administrative unit within the Hollola and later the Asikkala parish in the 15th century. The first church in the area was built in the village of Nastola (first mentioned in 1478), which gave its name to the chapel community and the later parish. Nastola became an independent parish in 1860.

Nastola was consolidated with Lahti in 2016.

Geography 

Nastola is wedged between the first and second Salpausselkäs, the former of which is a prominent feature in the terrain and landscape of the southern part of the municipality. Moving further east towards Iitti, the ridge becomes narrower and its ridgelines steepen in the surroundings of Uusikylä. The area between the Salpausselkäs is characterized by its eskers and valleys.

Till is the dominant type of soil in central and northern Nastola, with clay deposits mostly being concentrated to the south of the first Salpausselkä, as well as around the lakes of Ruuhijärvi, Sylvöjärvi and Oksjärvi. The rocks on the south side of the Salpausselkäs tend to be lower and more rounded, and the majority of the bedrock consists of granite. All of the lakes of Nastola, which are also all part of the Kymijärvi drainage basin, are situated to the north of the first Salpausselkä; to its south are several smaller streams of water.

List of villages 
Arrajoki, Immilä, Koiskala, Lankila, Pyhäntaka, Ruuhijärvi, Uusikylä, Vanaja, Villähde, Kirkonkylä, Rakokivi, Seesta- Luhtaanmaa, Järvinen, Tapiola.

Attractions 

 Pajulahti Sports Institute
 Anni Kaste Memorial stone
 Defenders of the home country memorial stone
 Nastola cemetery
 German memorial
 King's Ridge observation tower
 King's fountain
 Ruuhijärvi cultural landscape
 Mountain Troll's observation tower
 Engel's storehouse
 Immilä mill
 Kumia mill
 Nastola church
 Nastola history museum
 Taarasti Art Center

Notable people from Nastola

 Adelaïde Ehrnrooth, feminist author
 Elsi Borg, architect
 Eduard Polón, founder of Nokia
 Valtteri Bottas, Formula 1 driver
 Veli-Matti Lindström, ski jumper

References

External links
 
 Municipality of Nastola – Official website 

Nastola
Former municipalities of Finland